The following is a partial list of the "A" codes for Medical Subject Headings (MeSH), as defined by the United States National Library of Medicine (NLM).

This list continues the information at List of MeSH codes (A02). Codes following these are found at List of MeSH codes (A04). For other MeSH codes, see List of MeSH codes.

The source for this content is the set of 2006 MeSH Trees from the NLM.

– digestive system

– biliary tract

– bile ducts
  – extrahepatic bile ducts
  – common bile duct
  – Ampulla of Vater
  – Sphincter of Oddi
  – cystic duct
  – common hepatic duct
  – intrahepatic bile ducts
  – bile canaliculi

– gallbladder

– gastrointestinal tract

– intestines
 – intestinal mucosa
 – enterocytes
 – goblet cells
 – paneth cells
 – large intestine
 – anal canal
 – cecum
 – appendix
 – colon
 – ascending colon
 – descending colon
 – sigmoid colon
 – transverse colon
 – rectum
 – small intestine
 – duodenum
 – Ampulla of Vater
 – Sphincter of Oddi
 – Brunner Glands
 – ileum
 – ileocecal valve
 – Meckel Diverticulum
 – jejunum

– lower gastrointestinal tract
 – ileum
 – ileocecal valve
 – Meckel Diverticulum
 – large intestine
 – anal canal
 – cecum
 – appendix
 – colon
 – ascending colon
 – descending colon
 – sigmoid colon
 – transverse colon
 – rectum
 – jejunum

– mouth
 – dentition
 – salivary glands
 – parotid gland
 – salivary ducts
 – minor salivary glands
 – sublingual gland
 – submandibular gland
 – von Ebner glands
 – tongue
 – lingual frenum
 – taste buds

– pharynx

– upper gastrointestinal tract
 – duodenum
 – Ampulla of Vater
 – Sphincter of Oddi
 – Brunner Glands
 – esophagus
 – esophageal mucosa
 – upper esophageal sphincter
 – esophagogastric junction
 – lower esophageal sphincter
 – stomach
 – cardia
 – esophagogastric junction
 – lower esophageal sphincter
 – gastric fundus
 – gastric mucosa
 – gastric chief cells
 – enterochromaffin cells
 – gastrin-secreting cells
 – gastric parietal cells
 – somatostatin-secreting cells
 – gastric stump
 – pyloric antrum
 – pylorus

– liver

– intrahepatic bile ducts
 – bile canaliculi

– round ligament of liver

– pancreas

– islets of langerhans
 – glucagon-secreting cells
 – insulin-secreting cells
 – pancreatic polypeptide-secreting cells
 – somatostatin-secreting cells

– exocrine pancreas

– pancreatic ducts
 – Ampulla of Vater

The list continues at List of MeSH codes (A04).

A03